Ugly Side: An Acoustic Evening With Blue October is a live acoustic album by Blue October.  It is their third live album, and eighth album overall.  The album was recorded during a sold out three-day tour of Houston, Austin, and Dallas July 22–25, 2010 during which the band played two acoustic concerts each night (except in Austin).   The band had talked about recording an acoustic album as early as 2004, but the concerts were the first ever full-length acoustic shows that the band had ever performed.  The popularity of the acoustic concerts among Blue October fans resulted in the band deciding to perform a nationwide acoustic tour to support the release of the album.

Originally slated for April 26, 2011, the official release date was pushed back to May 10, 2011; however the band released the album on May 3 to fans who pre-ordered the album from the band's website, and the album was available for sale at the band's concerts prior to May 10.

All of the songs on the album had previously appeared on Blue October's studio albums, except for the track Colorado 5591, which the band had played at shows for years but never recorded.   The song is about Justin Furstenfeld's experience as a patient in a psychiatric hospital. The versions of the songs that appear on the album were selected by Blue October drummer Jeremy Furstenfeld, who is credited as the album's producer.

The album's cover is a photo of the marquee at the Paramount Theatre in Austin, Texas taken by Blue October roadie Dave Arnold.

The album peaked at No. 14 on the Billboard Independent Albums Chart, at No. 22 on the Top Rock Albums Chart, and No. 79 on the Billboard 200.

Track listing

Personnel 
Justin Furstenfeld – lead vocals, acoustic guitar
Jeremy Furstenfeld – drums, producer
Matt Noveskey – acoustic bass guitar, vocals
C.B. Hudson – acoustic guitar, vocals
Ryan Delahoussaye – mandolin, violin, keyboard, vocals
Alan Adams – percussion
Dave Arnold – photographer
Abel Longoria – photographer
Tim Palmer – mixing
Travis Kennedy – mixing assistant
Travis Hatem – live sound mixing engineer/Live audio multi track recording engineer
Jerry Tubb – mastering

2011 live albums
Blue October albums